Tage Jönsson (10 June 1920 – 22 August 2001) was a Swedish racewalker. He competed in the men's 50 kilometres walk at the 1948 Summer Olympics.

References

1920 births
2001 deaths
Athletes (track and field) at the 1948 Summer Olympics
Swedish male racewalkers
Olympic athletes of Sweden
Place of birth missing
20th-century Swedish people
21st-century Swedish people